Special D. (born Dennis Horstmann, 16 September 1980) is a German DJ and dance music artist who was particularly popular in the Netherlands, where he won the 'Best Dance International'  award at the 2004 TMF NL awards. He was also popular among the Eurodance scene in North America. The "D" in Special D comes from the DJ's first name, Dennis.

His best-known track, "Come With Me", reached number 6 in the UK Singles Chart and number 4 in the Irish Singles Chart in April 2004. He proceeded making more tracks, such as "You" or "Here I Am", which were frequently played on European dance floors.

His music featured in Crank: High Voltage.

He has started using Ableton Live in his live sets.

Discography

Albums
Reckless (2004)

Singles

References

External links

Special D MySpace website
Discogs Entry

1980 births
Living people
German dance musicians
German trance musicians
Musicians from Hamburg